Torbjørn Eirik Økland (born 25 December 1964) is a Norwegian musician. Together with Øyvind Staveland he was the founder of the Norwegian band Vamp.

Økland is also a studio musician for a number of well-known Norwegian artists.

He is also a member of the folk-inspired group Streif .

References

1964 births
Living people
Norwegian musicians
Place of birth missing (living people)
Norwegian multi-instrumentalists